The 1996 Iowa State Senate elections took place as part of the biennial 1996 United States elections. Iowa voters elected state senators in half of the state senate's districts—the 25 even-numbered state senate districts. State senators serve four-year terms in the Iowa State Senate, with half of the seats up for election each cycle. A statewide map of the 50 state Senate districts in the year 1996 is provided by the Iowa General Assembly here.

The primary election on June 4, 1996 determined which candidates appeared on the November 5, 1996 general election ballot. Primary election results can be obtained here. General election results can be obtained here.

Following the previous election, Democrats had control of the Iowa state Senate with 27 seats to Republicans' 23 seats.

To take control of the chamber from Democrats, the Republicans needed to net 3 Senate seats.

Republicans claimed control of the Iowa State Senate following the 1996 general election  by netting 6 seats, resulting in Republicans holding 29 seats and Democrats having 21 seats.

Summary of Results
NOTE: The 25 odd-numbered districts did not have elections in 1996 so they are not listed here.

Source:

Detailed Results
Reminder: Only even-numbered Iowa Senate seats were up for election in 1996; therefore, odd-numbered seats did not have elections in 1996 & are not shown.

Note: If a district does not list a primary, then that district did not have a competitive primary (i.e., there may have only been one candidate file for that district).

District 2

District 4

District 6

District 8

District 10

District 12

District 14

District 16

District 18

District 20

District 22

District 24

District 26

District 28

District 30

District 32

District 34

District 36

District 38

District 40

District 42

District 44

District 46

District 48

District 50

See also
 United States elections, 1996
 United States House of Representatives elections in Iowa, 1996
 Elections in Iowa

References

1996 Iowa elections
Iowa Senate elections
Iowa State Senate